"Help Yourself" is a song by English singer and songwriter Amy Winehouse from her debut studio album Frank (2003). Released as the album's fourth and final single on 23 August 2004 as a double A-side with "Fuck Me Pumps" (Pumps), it reached number 65 on the UK Singles Chart. The song was not included on the U.S. release of Frank. A radio edit was released for promotional purposes. The song samples "You Won't Be Satisfied (Until You Break My Heart)" as recorded by Doris Day in 1945.

Personnel
Credits adapted from "Pumps / Help Yourself" CD liner notes

Songwriting – Amy Winehouse, Jimmy Hogarth
Producer – Jimmy Hogarth
Vocals – Amy Winehouse
Bass, drums, guitar, percussion, programming – Jimmy Hogarth
Horn, organ – Martin Slattery
Mixing – Cameron Craig, Jimmy Hogarth

Track listing
UK CD single 
"Pumps"
"Help Yourself"
"(There Is) No Greater Love" (AOL Session)

UK CD single 
"Help Yourself" (radio edit) – 4:00
"Pumps" (clean radio edit) – 3:19

Charts

References

2003 songs
2004 singles
Amy Winehouse songs
Songs written by Jimmy Hogarth
Songs written by Amy Winehouse
Island Records singles